Queen's Bridge railway station was the terminus of the Belfast Central Railway which ran from the Ulster (later Belfast Central) Junction on the Ulster Railway to Ballymacarrett Junction on the Belfast and County Down Railway, through central Belfast, Ireland.

History

The Belfast Central Railway was built in 1875 to connect the three railway lines in Belfast (the Ulster Railway, the Belfast and County Down Railway (BCDR) and the Belfast and Northern Counties Railway (BNCR)). It branched off from the Ulster Railway (later the Great Northern Railway (Ireland) (GNRI) at Ulster Junction, and ran for 1½ miles to Queen's Bridge, with a branch from East Bridge Street Junction to the BCDR at Ballymacarrett Junction. A link to the BNCR was built later, via a tunnel under Queen's Bridge to the dock board railway at Donegall Quay Junction which, in turn, connected to the BNCR. This was used for goods only.

Queen's Bridge station opened to passengers in 1878. It had a single platform on which stood a single-storey brick building with a pitched roof and rectangular window openings. In 1885, the Belfast Central Railway was acquired by GNRI, closed to passengers and Ormeau station was consequently closed. The station was demolished in 1960 and the line from East Bridge Street Junction to Donegall Quay Junction was closed on 3 June 1963 by the Ulster Transport Authority (UTA).

References 

Disused railway stations in Belfast
Railway stations opened in 1878
Railway stations closed in 1885
1878 establishments in Ireland
1885 disestablishments in Ireland
Railway stations in Northern Ireland opened in the 19th century